The men's Super heavyweight event was part of the boxing programme at the 1984 Summer Olympics. The weight class allowed boxers of more than 91 kilograms to compete. The competition was held from 3 to 11 August 1984. 11 boxers from 11 nations competed.

Medalists

Results
The following boxers took part in the event:

First round
 Peter Hussing (FRG) def. Olaf Mayer (AUT), 5:0
 Lennox Lewis (CAN) def.  Mohammad Yousuf (PAK), RSC-3
 Tyrell Biggs (USA) def. Isaac Barrientos (PUR), 5:0

Quarterfinals
 Francesco Damiani (ITA) def. Willie Isangura (TNZ), RSC-2
 Robert Wells (GBR) def. Viliami Pulu (TNG), KO-1
 Aziz Salihu (YUG) def. Peter Hussing (FRG), 3:2
 Tyrell Biggs (USA) def. Lennox Lewis (CAN), 5:0

Semifinals
 Francesco Damiani (ITA) def. Robert Wells (GBR), RSC-3
 Tyrell Biggs (USA) def. Aziz Salihu (YUG), 5:0

Final
 Tyrell Biggs (USA) def. Francesco Damiani (ITA), 4:1

References

Super Heavyweight